Arenicella chitinivorans is a Gram-negative, rod-shaped, strictly aerobic and non-motile bacterium from the genus of Arenicella which has been isolated from the sea urchin Strongylocentrotus intermedius.

References

Alteromonadales
Bacteria described in 2013